Donje Sokolovo  is a village in the municipalities of Ribnik, Republika Srpska and Ključ, Bosnia and Herzegovina.

Demographics 
According to the 2013 census, its population was two, both Serbs living in the Ključ part, thus none in the Republika Srpska part.

References

Populated places in Ključ
Populated places in Ribnik